The Marquette University School of Dentistry is the dental school of Marquette University. It is located in Milwaukee, Wisconsin, United States. Formerly the Dental Department of the Milwaukee Medical College (MMC), the school opened on September 26, 1894. It is the only dental school in Wisconsin.

History
On September 26, 1894, when the Dental Department of the Milwaukee Medical College commenced, there were nine faculty members for the 30 entering freshmen. Dean of the school was professor of oral surgery Benjamin G. Maercklein. The dental clinic consisted of 16 chairs and a technique laboratory.
  
In 1897 the Dental Department of the Milwaukee Medical College was recognized by the National Association of Dental Faculties.

In 1899 the Wisconsin College of Physicians and Surgeons added a dental department.  Because both schools competed for students and faculty, they merged in 1913.

Henry L. Banzhaf of Wisconsin was named dean of the Dental Department in 1902, and remain in that position for 42 years.

In 1907 Milwaukee Medical College became affiliated with Marquette College, a liberal arts college in Milwaukee, which added combined dentistry, medicine, nursing, and pharmacy departments, and became a university.

In 1921 Dean Banzhaf was granted permission to build a new dental building, which would be ready in 1923. It featured 167 chairs, gaining the reputation for being the "largest dental clinic under one roof". It contained one of the first labs to be established in connection with a dental clinic.

In the early 1970s the old 1921 dental facility was gutted.

In August 2002 a new dental facility was completed, which had been planned around technological improvements and innovative teaching methods.

In 2003, the Marquette University School of Dentistry pioneered a patient-centered clinical curriculum.

The school is currently raising funds for a $16 million, 40,000-square-foot expansion that will add clinical, lab and classroom space. Annual class size will increase by 20 students, from 80 to 100. The state of Wisconsin has committed $8 million to the project in its 2011-2013 biennial budget and the School of Dentistry is raising $8 million in matching funds through its "Building for the Future" campaign. Groundbreaking is planned for spring 2012, with the first expanded class to begin in 2013.

In June 2012, Rick Kushner, an alumnus of the school, donated $1 million towards the expansion. The donation helped create a fifth clinic in the School of Dentistry, to be named the Comfort Dental Clinic, after the name of Kushner's dental franchise.

Academics
Marquette University School of Dentistry awards the following degrees:
Master of Science in Dental Biomaterials
Doctor of Dental Surgery

The school comprises the following departments:
Department of Clinical Services
Department of Developmental Sciences
Department of General Dental Sciences
Department of Surgical Sciences

Marquette School of Dentistry offers graduate programs in Dental Biomaterials, Orthodontics, Prosthodontics, and Endodontics.

The School of Dentistry treats underserved patients at seven clinics around the state, sees 26,000 unduplicated patients annually and serves 64 of the state’s 72 counties.

Accreditation
Marquette University School of Dentistry is accredited by the American Dental Association.

Admissions
Marquette School of Dentistry enrolls 100 freshmen each year, 50 Wisconsin residents and 50 non-residents.

Alumni 
 Silas J. Kloehn

See also

References

Marquette University
Universities and colleges in Milwaukee
Educational institutions established in 1968
Dental schools in Wisconsin